Nádson Rodrigues de Souza (born 30 January 1982), usually known as Nádson, is a Brazilian former professional footballer who played as a striker.

Club career 
Before moving to the Suwon Samsung Bluewings in South Korea, Nádson played for Vitória.

Nádson was the first ever foreign MVP of the K League in the 2004 season. He is known by Korean fans as "Nadgol", a portmanteau of the words "Nádson" and "Gol", the Portuguese word for "Goal".

After suffering from serious injury problems in the 2006 season, Nádson returned to Brazil to play for Corinthians as a short-term replacement for West Ham United-bound Carlos Tevez.

On 24 July 2008, Nádson went to Japan to play for Vegalta Sendai, but left after six months to return to Vitória.

In January 2010, Nádson transferred to Sport Club do Recife.

International career 
Nádson participated with the Brazil national team at the 2003 CONCACAF Gold Cup.

Style of play 
Although having a small stature, he is known for his sensorial positioning and goal determination. He was also a speedy dribbler.

Career statistics

Honours
Suwon Samsung Bluewings
 K League: 2004
 K League Cup: 2005, 2008

Sport Recife
 Campeonato Pernambucano: 2010
 CONCACAF Gold Cup: runner-up 2003

Individual
 K League Most Valuable Player: 2004
 K League Best XI: 2004

References

External links 
 
 
 
 CBF Profile 
 

1982 births
Living people
Sportspeople from Bahia
Brazilian footballers
Association football forwards
Brazil international footballers
2003 CONCACAF Gold Cup players
K League 1 Most Valuable Player Award winners
K League 1 players
J2 League players
Qatari Second Division players
Esporte Clube Vitória players
Esporte Clube Bahia players
Sport Club do Recife players
Suwon Samsung Bluewings players
Sport Club Corinthians Paulista players
Vegalta Sendai players
América Futebol Clube (RN) players
Al-Shamal SC players
Brazilian expatriate footballers
Brazilian expatriate sportspeople in South Korea
Expatriate footballers in South Korea
Brazilian expatriate sportspeople in Japan
Expatriate footballers in Japan
Brazilian expatriate sportspeople in Qatar
Expatriate footballers in Qatar